Isaac Lucas may refer to:

 Isaac Benson Lucas (1867–1940), Attorney General of Ontario, Canada
 Isaac Lucas (rugby union) (born 1999), Australian rugby union player for the Queensland Reds